Federal Prison Industries, Inc. (FPI), doing business as UNICOR (stylized as unicor) since 1977, is a wholly owned United States government corporation created in 1934 as a prison labor program for inmates within the Federal Bureau of Prisons, and a component of the Department of Justice. It is headquartered in Washington, D.C.

Under US federal law, all physically able inmates who are not a security risk or have a health exception are required to work, either for UNICOR or at some other prison job. As of 2021, inmates earned between $0.23 to $1.15 per hour.

As a "mandatory source" for federal departments (having priority over all other sources, including JWOD sources from blind or severely disabled persons), FPI receives priority in any purchases of the products that it offers.

History 

A statute in May 1930 provided for the employment of prisoners, the creation of a corporation for the purpose was authorized by a statute in June 1934, and the Federal Prison Industries was created by executive order in December 1934 by Franklin D. Roosevelt.

Activities
Under current law, all physically able inmates who are not a security risk or have a health exception are required to work, either for UNICOR or at some other prison job. Inmates earn from US$0.23 per hour up to a maximum of US$1.15 per hour, and all inmates with court-ordered financial obligations must use at least 50% of this UNICOR income to satisfy those debts.

Deductions are then taken for taxes, victim restitution, program costs and court-imposed legal obligations.  In fiscal year 2016, FPI’s business were organized, managed, and internally reported as six operation segments based upon products and services.  These segments are Agribusiness, Clothing and Textiles, Electronics, Office Furniture, Recycling, and Services.

UNICOR currently produces the Interceptor body armor vest, primarily for foreign sales and international customers.

Criticism
One report detailed an FPI operation at a California prison in which inmates de-manufactured computer cathode-type monitors. Industry standard practice for this mandates a mechanical crushing machine to minimize danger from flying glass, with an isolated air system to avoid releasing lead, barium, and phosphor compounds to the workplace atmosphere. At the FPI facility prisoners de-manufactured CRTs with hammers. FPI initiated corrective action to address this finding, and claims to currently meet or exceed industry standards in its recycling operations.

Combat helmets produced by FPI at one factory were at the center of a US Department of Justice lawsuit and $3 million settlement paid by ArmorSource, the prime contractor. The U.S. Attorney's Offices declined to criminally prosecute or file any civil action against FPI staff. The helmets were produced for ArmorSource between 2008 and 2009 and failed to meet standards. The recall of both helmets cost FPI $19 million. With Defense Contract Management Agency audit staff, FPI identified opportunities to improve its Quality Management System in areas including improved management staff oversight, proper control of quality procedures, training, and implementation of corrective action. FPI implemented new procedures to address these areas.

After the January 6 United States Capitol attack, multiple sources noted because FPI is a “mandatory source” for the federal government, it would receive priority when the federal government purchases products made by FPI such as office furniture to replace what was damaged in the violent protest.

See also

 Prison labour in the United States
 California Prison Industry Authority
 Chain gang
 Convict leasing
 Incarceration in the United States
 Labor camp
 Title 28 of the Code of Federal Regulations

References

External links

 UNICOR Federal Prison Industries
 Federal Prison Industries in the Federal Register

Federal Bureau of Prisons
Penal system in the United States
Prison-related organizations
Penal labor in the United States
Government agencies established in 1934
1934 establishments in the United States